Kudelin is a village in the Bregovo Municipality of the Vidin Province of Bulgaria.

Geography

Demography
In 1934, the population of Kudelin was 433. By 1975 it reached its maximum of 586, decreasing to 405 people by 2001, and 317 by 2018.

At the 2011 census, the population was 385, of which 96.1% were ethnically Bulgarian.
 
Local people earn their living mainly from cereal farming. The Danube and Timok rivers are used for recreation and fishing.

History 
Historically, the village was called "Wallachian Rakovica". In 1934 it was renamed after Kudelin, a joint ruler of Braničevo at the end of the 13th century.

At the outbreak of First Balkan War in 1912, a local man enlisted in the Macedonian-Adrianopolitan Volunteer Corps. 

The first lighthouse on Bulgaria's shore of the Danube was built in Kudelin.

References

Villages in Vidin Province